was the 2nd daimyō of Kuroishi Domain, and later the 11th daimyō of Hirosaki Domain in northern Mutsu Province, Honshū, Japan (modern-day Aomori Prefecture). His courtesy title was Ōsumi-no-kami, and his Court rank was Junior Fourth Rank, Lower Grade.

Biography
Tsugaru Yukitsugu was born as Matsudaira Yukinori, the 5th son of Matsudaira Nobuakira, the daimyō of Yoshida Domain in Mikawa Province. He was adopted on June 5, 1821, as the heir to Tsugaru Chikatari, the daimyō of Kuroishi Domain. On his adoptive father’s retirement, as Tsugaru Yukinori, he became the 2nd daimyō of Kuroishi Domain from  1825 to 1839. He was known as an intelligent ruler, and worked for the restoration of the domain's finances during the political and agricultural crisis of the Tenpō era. After the Tokugawa shogunate forced Tsugaru Nobuyuki  of Hirosaki Domain into retirement over allegations of gross misrule, Yukinori was ordered to change his name to Tsugaru Yukitsugu and to take his place as the 11th daimyō of Hirosaki. He turned the rule of Kuroishi Domain over to his brother, Tsugaru Tsuguyasu.

Yukitsugu brought in the noted Confucian scholar Satō Issai as an advisor and  attempted to continue implementation many of the reforms initiated by Tsugaru Nobuakira to restore prosperity to the disaster-prone domain, expanding on Nobuakira’s code of ethics from five articles to thirty in an attempt to rein in his unruly retainers. In addition to expanding the domain's agricultural land through opening of new paddy fields, Yukitsugu also established a foundry for the casting of cannons, and attempted to modernize the domain's military and medical levels through the introduction of rangaku studies. In 1855, the domain was ordered to assist in the defences of Ezo, and established a military outpost of what the now the city of Wakkanai.

In 1859 Yukitsugu turned the reign over to his adopted son, Tsugaru Tsuguakira, and retired to pursue studies in literature and waka poetry. He died at the clan's Edo residence in 1865. His grave is at the clan temple of Shinryō-in (a subsidiary of Kan'ei-ji) in Taitō-ku, Tokyo.

See also
Tsugaru clan

References 
 Kurotaki, Jūjirō (1984). Tsugaru-han no hanzai to keibatsu 津軽藩の犯罪と刑罰. Hirosaki: Hoppō shinsha.
 Narita, Suegorō (1975). Tsugaru Tamenobu: shidan 津軽為信: 史談. Aomori: Tōō Nippōsha.
 Tsugaru Tsuguakira Kō Den kankōkai (1976). Tsugaru Tsuguakira kō-den 津輕承昭公傳. Tokyo: Rekishi Toshosha
 The content of much of this article was derived from that of the corresponding article on Japanese Wikipedia.

External links
 "Hirosaki-jō" (17 February 2008)
 "Tsugaru-han" on Edo 300 HTML (17 February 2008)
Koyasu Nobushige (1880). Buke kazoku meiyoden 武家家族名誉伝 Volume 1. Tokyo: Koyasu Nobushige. (Accessed from National Diet Library, 17 July 2008)

|-

Tozama daimyo
Ōkōchi-Matsudaira clan
Tsugaru clan
1800 births
1865 deaths
People of Edo-period Japan